Mont Rouge is a mountain of the Swiss Pennine Alps, located south of Nendaz and Hérémence in the canton of Valais. It lies between the valleys of Nendaz and Hérémence, on the chain north of the Rosablanche.

References

External links
 Mont Rouge on Hikr

Mountains of the Alps
Mountains of Switzerland
Mountains of Valais
Two-thousanders of Switzerland